The 2020–21 Liga Unike was the inaugural season of the Liga Unike, a professional basketball league in Albania and Kosovo. It started on 6 April 2021 with the quarter-finals and ended on 14 April 2021 with the finals.

Teams
Top four teams from 2019–20 Albanian Basketball Superleague and 2019–20 Kosovo Basketball Superleague respectively will participate in the competition. On 5 April 2021, Teuta Durrës withdrew from the competition due to the inability to organize for a short time.

Venues and locations

Note: Table lists in alphabetical order.

Notes
ABSL = Albanian Basketball Superleague
KBSL = Kosovo Basketball Superleague

Playoff

Bracket
The competition will take place in the Final Eight format with single elimination system and the first quarterfinal matches will be played in Rahovec on 6 and 7 April 2021, while the semifinal matches, the race for third place and the grand final of the Liga Unike will take place on 13 and 14 April in Durrës.

Season statistics

Individual game highs

Notes and references

Notes

References

External links
 

Liga Unike